Calvera may refer to:
 Calvera, a city in the province of Potenza, southern Italy
 Calvera, a character from the film The Magnificent Seven, played by Eli Wallach
 Calvera (X-ray source), the nickname for 1RXS J141256.0+792204, an isolated neutron star located in the constellation of Ursa Minor, named after the character from The Magnificent Seven.